Raywood is a town in northern Victoria, Australia.

Raywood Post Office opened on 4 January 1864.

Golfers play at the course of the Raywood Golf Club on Speke Street.

Raywood is the home of the Bendigo Gliding Club.

See also
 Raywood railway station

References

External links

Towns in Victoria (Australia)
Bendigo
Suburbs of Bendigo